The Union Temple of Brooklyn is a Reform synagogue located at 17 Eastern Parkway between Underhill Avenue and Plaza Street East in the Prospect Heights neighborhood of Brooklyn, New York City,  across the street from the Brooklyn Public Library, the Brooklyn Museum, and the Brooklyn Botanic Garden. It is the result of the merger of two nineteenth century congregations, K. K. Beth Elohim and Temple Israel. The synagogue is led by Rabbi Stephanie Kolin.

The building was designed by Arnold Brunner and completed in 1929 as the community house for a planned temple next door, which was never built because of the Great Depression; the 11-story building has been used for the congregation's worship since, except, in the past, on High Holy Days, when the Brooklyn Academy of Music was utilized. In 1942, a theatre in the building was remodeled to be a sanctuary.

In 2015 it was listed on the National Register of Historic Places.

K. K. Beth Elohim

Founded in 1848 by German and Alsatian Jewish immigrants living in the village of Williamsburgh, K.K. Beth Elohim was the first Jewish congregation established in Brooklyn and the first on Long Island.  It is a member congregation of the Union of Reform Judaism.

The congregation first worshiped in a private home on Marcy Avenue. In 1860 a former  church building on South First Street was purchased and remodeled for use as a synagogue, it was afterwards used as a school offered elementary education in English and German, in both secular and religious subjects. The school closed when public education began in Brooklyn.

A new synagogue was built on Keap Street south of Division Avenue in 1876. Known as the Keap Street Temple, for many years it was the largest synagogue in Brooklyn. It is among the oldest synagogue buildings still standing in the United States.

Raphael Benjamin was rabbi of the synagogue from 1902 to 1905.

Temple Israel

Temple Israel was founded in 1869. Until 1872 services were held in the Y.M.C.A. building on the corner of Fulton Street and Galatin Place in Williamsburg, Brooklyn. In that year the congregation purchased a former church building on Greene Avenue. Temple Israel dedicated a larger and more magnificent new building on the corner of Bedford and Lafayette Avenues in 1891.

Union Temple

Temple Israel and K.K. Beth Elohim merged in 1921, deciding to erect a new temple in the newly fashionable location of 17 Eastern Parkway (Brooklyn). Plans were drawn up by Arnold Brunner for a Classical temple with an adjacent eleven-story community house.  The community house was erected first, and dedicated in 1929. Because of the Great Depression, the planned Temple was never built. Instead, the congregation continued to worship in the Community House.   During the High Holy Days the congregation worshiped at the Brooklyn Academy of Music. In 1942, the theater on the ground floor of the Community House was remodeled as a sanctuary, designed after the old synagogue in Essen, Germany burned by the Nazis.

Victim of anti-semitic hate speech

On November 1, 2018, events at Union Temple were cancelled after "Kill All Jews" and graffiti was found inside.  New York mayor Bill de Blasio said it was "the vilest kind of hate." Police accused James Polite, a Brooklyn native.

Tenants
The German School Brooklyn (GSB), a German government-recognized German international school, is on the facility's fifth floor. The school is not a part of the temple's congregation even though it shares a building. Grades K-3 are scheduled to remain at the temple while grades 4 and onwards are scheduled to move to a renovated property in Crown Heights.

Notable members
Nathan S. Jonas (1868-1943) — Banker and philanthropist
Max Rose (born 1986) — US Congressman from New York's 11th congressional district, and US Army Bronze Star recipient.

Inside
A memorial plaque in honor of Mickey Marcus is located in the lobby of the Union Temple of Brooklyn where his funeral service was conducted. It reads:

"Killed in action in the hills of Zion while leading Israeli forces as their supreme commander in the struggle for Israel's freedom—Blessed is the match that is consumed in kindling flame/ Blessed is the flame that burns in the secret fastness of the heart/ Blessed is the heart with strength to stop its beating for honor's sake/ Blessed is the match that is consumed in kindling flame—Dedicated by his fellow members of Union Temple of Brooklyn December 9, 1949."

Merge With CBE
On March 26, 2021 Union Temple merged with Congregation Beth Elohim

See also
National Register of Historic Places listings in Kings County, New York
Oldest synagogues in the United States
Brooklyn Hebrew Orphan Asylum

References

External links

 

Synagogues in Brooklyn
Reform synagogues in New York City
Alsatian-Jewish culture in the United States
French-American culture in New York City
German-Jewish culture in New York City
Properties of religious function on the National Register of Historic Places in Brooklyn
Synagogues on the National Register of Historic Places in New York City
Jewish organizations established in 1921
1921 establishments in New York City
Synagogues completed in 1929
1929 establishments in New York City
Neoclassical synagogues